The Utah Warriors was an American rugby union team based in Salt Lake City, Utah. The team played in the Rugby Super League in the 2011 season, but then folded in 2012.

History 
The Utah Rugby Union made a formal request to join the Rugby Super League in 2010 and was accepted into the national competition for the 2011 season. The Utah Warriors team was formed mainly from rugby players within the state of Utah, but also attracted marquee signings such as US national players Mike Palefau and Jason Pye. The Warriors had an active roster of more than 35 players. Utah entrepreneur Sean Whalen oversaw the team's operations and Jon Law was the head coach.

The Warriors finished mid-table in their conference with a 3–3 record in 2011 and did not make the play-offs. The team was dropped from the league for the 2012 season after failing to register their players by the required deadline.

Successor
In 2017, Rugby Utah Ventures resurrected the name "Utah Warriors" for their team to compete in Major League Rugby.

– See: Utah Warriors

References

External links
Rugby Utah
USA Rugby

Archives

Rugby union teams in Utah
Rugby clubs established in 2010
Sports in Salt Lake City
2010 establishments in Utah
2012 disestablishments in Utah
Sports clubs disestablished in 2012